The Boeing C-108 Flying Fortress was an American transport aircraft used during World War II. Four were converted from B-17 Flying Fortress heavy bombers.

Design and development

The first C-108 built (designated XC-108) was a B-17E (41-2593) converted to a V.I.P. transport for General Douglas MacArthur in 1943. With the exception of the nose and tail turrets, all armament was removed, as was all armor. The interior of the plane was made into a flying office for MacArthur, with extra windows, cooking facilities, and living space. To facilitate entry and exit, a drop-down door with steps was installed in the rear fuselage. A similar conversion was later made on a B-17F-40-VE  (42-6036), which was redesignated YC-108.

Between August 1943 and March 1944, another B-17E (41-2595) was converted to a cargo aircraft and designated XC-108A. Hoping to convert obsolete bombers into cargo aircraft, the United States Army Air Forces initiated a remanufacturing station at Wright-Patterson Air Force Base.  The plane was stripped of armament, armor, and other military equipment. Crew locations were shifted, and the nose was modified to provide space for cargo and/or personnel.  The cockpit was accessed via the crawlway under it or through the hinged solid nose cone that had replaced the original glazed bombardier station.  To increase cargo space, several bulkheads were removed and the bomb bay doors were sealed closed.  This allowed much of the fuselage volume to be used to carry cargo or personnel.

A B-17F 42-30190 was converted (and given designation XC-108B) to tanker service.  As in the XC-108A, it was devoid of armor and weapons, and the fuselage was modified to make space for its cargo.  The fuselage was filled with fuel tanks.

Operational history

The XC-108 was personal VIP transport aircraft of General Douglas MacArthur in 1943.

The XC-108A was used to fly material and personnel over the Himalayas to the B-29 base in Chengdu, China. Due to chronic engine difficulties, it proved an impractical cargo aircraft. In October 1944, it was returned to the United States. By the end of the war, it was disassembled and left in a junkyard in Maine, where it suffered from some parts being scrapped and others salvaged from the airframe. Since then it has been rescued and is under restoration back to B-17E configuration.

Variants

XC-108
B-17E converted to VIP transport standard for General Douglas MacArthur. Originally B-17E s/n 41-2593.

YC-108
B-17F converted to VIP transport standard for General Douglas MacArthur. Originally B-17F s/n 42-6036.

XC-108A
B-17E converted to cargo or troop transport standard. Originally B-17E s/n 41-2595, known as "Desert Rat".

XC-108B
B-17F converted for service as a tanker. Originally B-17F s/n 42-30190.

Two other cargo transports and VIP transports were made from the B-17.

CB-17G
Troop transport version capable of carrying up to 64 troops, 25 built.

VB-17G
VIP transport version for high level staff officers, 8 built.

Operators

United States Army Air Forces

Specifications (XC-108)

Survivors
XC-108A, 41-2595, "Desert Rat", survived in a New England junkyard and is undergoing restoration in McHenry County, Illinois, by a private individual to B-17E configuration.

See also

Sources
 Jablonski, Edward. Flying Fortress.  Doubleday, 1965. 
 Wagner, Ray. American Combat Planes.  Doubleday, 1982. 
 Encyclopedia of American Aircraft
 USAF Museum
 Andrade, John M. . U.S Military Aircraft Designations and Serials since 1909. Leicester : Midland Counties Publications, First edition 1979. .

References

External links

 Encyclopedia of American Aircraft
 USAF Museum
 B-17E Desert Rat Restoration Project

C-0108 Flying Fortress
1940s United States military transport aircraft
World War II transport aircraft of the United States
Four-engined tractor aircraft
Low-wing aircraft
C-108
Aircraft first flown in 1943
Four-engined piston aircraft